Water supply in Afghanistan is managed by the National Water Affairs Regulation Authority (NWARA), which is based in Kabul, Afghanistan. The nation's water supply is characterized by a number of achievements and challenges. Among the achievements are:
 the expansion of rural water supply infrastructure with the active participation of communities as part of the National Solidarity Program;
 the successful expansion of water supply in the city of Herat and towns such as Kunduz; and
 a reform of the institutional framework for urban water supply through the decentralization of service provision from an ineffective national agency to local utilities managed on the basis of commercial principles.

Challenges include
 the tense security situation, especially in the south and east of the country, that limits the mobility of personnel;
 dilapidated infrastructure as a result of decades of war and neglect;
 a high level of non-revenue water estimated at 40% including water use from illegal connections;
 inappropriate pipe materials such as asbestos-cement used for older pipes;
 a lack of qualified personnel;
 widespread poverty; and
 traditional social norms especially concerning the role of women.

The latter make it hard, for example, to read meters within premises or to involve women in participatory processes.

In urban areas, additional challenges include:
 delays in the procurement of large works, due to a large extent to the absence of contractors with sufficient capacity to execute large works;
 the pollution of shallow groundwater because of a lack of sanitation; and
 poor service quality of piped water supply, including service interruptions that are partly caused by unreliable electricity supply.

Access and service quality

Overview

Afghanistan is able to store 75 billion cubic meters of fresh water annually. As of 2019, only about 67% of the country's population has access to drinking water. This number is expected to steadily increase in the future, especially in Kabul after the Shah wa Arus and Shahtoot dams are completed. A number of other smaller dams are being built in other parts of the country.

Access to an improved water source does not mean that the water is safe to drink. For example, protected shallow wells in urban areas are often contaminated with bacteria. Piped water supply can also be contaminated. Many households without access to an improved source take water from streams and rivers, open wells and unprotected springs, all of which are also often polluted. In rural areas women and girls walk long distances to fetch water.

There have been considerable improvements in access to water supply in the last several years. A countrywide Multiple Indicator Cluster Survey carried out during the reign of the Taliban in 1997 found that an estimated 7% of the rural population and 17% of the urban population had access to an improved water source at the time. While the survey results represent estimates that have a certain margin of error, the recorded improvements in rural areas match the fact that significant investments were undertaken by NGOs and by the government under the National Solidarity Program initiated in 2003. The improvements in urban areas are somewhat puzzling, since no major investments in water supply systems took place during that period in Kabul and Kandahar. Possibly the 1997 figure does not include the urban population served by public wells. Furthermore, service quality, which is often poor, is not reflected in the above figures. For example, because of poor electrical service, serious voltage fluctuations, poor installation of equipment and lack of preventive maintenance, pump failures are frequent and lead to supply interruptions.

In 2004 the mortality rate of children under 5 was as high as 25%. Half of these deaths were caused by water-borne diseases. Household surveys indicated that spending on health care was second only to food.

Kabul

As of 2005, about half a million people or 15% of the population of Kabul were connected to the piped water supply system through an estimated 30,000 house connections. Some of those who are not connected receive water from their neighbors or from public hand pumps, both of which are considered as improved water sources. Many Kabul residents get their water from up to 100,000 shallow private wells that are often polluted and vulnerable to drought. According to a United States Geological Survey study carried out from 2005 to 2007, about a quarter of shallow wells have fallen dry. Roughly 40% of the remaining wells could fall seasonally or permanently dry because of increased withdrawals, if they are not deepened. Reduced water availability because of the impacts of climate change could further exacerbate the situation.

The public piped water supply system provides about 60,000 cubic meter of water per day through separate piped networks in 2005 from three different sources:
 The Logar River aquifer south-east of the city;
 The Afshar well field drawing from the Paghman River aquifer to the west;
 The Alaudin well field drawing from the Upper Kabul Aquifer to the south.

In addition, a small part of the city is connected to a distribution system served by the Qargha Karez. However, this traditional water supply system had fallen dry in 2002.

Water supply to those fortunate enough to be connected was about 100 liter per capita per-day, assuming 15 people per connection and one third of physical water losses in the distribution network. This per capita water use is almost as high as in Germany. However, water quality is poor, supply is intermittent and the great majority who do not have access to the piped network have to get by with much less water. The Kabul water project aimed at tripling the number of house connections to 90,000 and doubling water production from existing well fields as well as from a new well field on the Lower Kabul River aquifer, providing water to more than 600,000 people.

The Kabul water project was to be financed by both KfW (well field extension and reservoir) and the World Bank (transmission line, distribution network, house connections and meters). The project was supposed to be completed in 2010. However, the World Bank withdrew from the project because of disputes over procurement.

Kandahar
In Kandahar there is only one network supplied by three or four deep wells. In 2002, it delivered only 2,500 cubic meter per-day to a city of nearly half a million. Most of the population depends on polluted shallow wells that are at risk of running dry. For irrigation purposes the population of Kandahar depends on the Dahla Dam north of the city.

Herat
As of 2012 Herat had more than 39,000 house connections, all of which are equipped with meters. About 45 percent of the population in the service area of the water company had access to piped water supply, including 85 percent in the city itself and around 30 percent in the surrounding areas. Since 2008, the local public water company – officially called a "strategic business unit" of the national water company - has been operating at a profit. The profit is reinvested in infrastructure. According to the German development agency GIZ, the service of the Herat water utility "can be compared to similar set-ups in industrialized countries." With 105 employees in 2013 the water utility is not overstaffed; its ratio of 2.5 employees per 1,000 connections corresponds to international good practice. The utility receives its water from wells. About half the wells are within the city and the other half in the outskirts. Drinking water quality is not systematically monitored. According to a non-representative survey carried out in 2013, two-thirds of customers receive only intermittent water supply with interruptions of up to one and a half days, one third indicated that the amount of water received - 60 liter per capita per day on average - was insufficient, one third said that their water meters had not been read for at least the last six months, and almost all complained about insufficient water pressure. The water company collects only about 75 percent of the total amount of water billed. With German financing, a new well field, transmission line and storage facilities were completed in 2008. The additional water quantity allowed to quadruple the number of house connections between 2002 and 2012. The new well field has also improved water quality, according to residents surveyed. Households not connected to the piped network use shallow wells or water vendors.

The Afghan-India Friendship Dam (Salma Dam) was built in Herat Province in 2016. Another is the Pashdan Dam, which is under construction and expected to be completed in 2021.

Kunduz
In Kunduz water supply improved substantially since 2007. From April 2007 until December 2009 the number of connections increased from 370 to 2,100, providing piped water supply to about one third of the city. The network was expanded from 14 to 71 km. A new computer-aided accounting system is being introduced to help increase the share of bills paid. In 2008, for the first time revenues covered operating costs. Residents of Kunduz rely on water from the Kunduz and [Khanabad] Rivers] for irrigation purposes.

Lashkar Gah
It was announced in 2005 that a USAID-funded project would build six reservoirs in Lashkar Gah, with responsibility for the water supply then being handed over to the Helmand and Arghandab Valley Authority. The city had been without fresh water for the previous 30 years due to the contamination of the Helmand River. The people of Lashkar Gah rely on the Kajaki Dam for irrigation, which is located near by in the Kajaki District of Helmand Province.

Zaranj
Residents of Zaranj will be receiving drinking water from the Kamal Khan Dam, which is located about 95 km to the southeast of Zaranj in the Chahar Burjak District of Nimruz Province.

Responsibility for water supply

Responsibilities within the government 

Policy setting and the channeling of resources provided by external donors for water supply investments is the responsibility of at least five Afghan Ministries.

 The National Water Affairs Regulation Authority (formerly the Ministry of Water and Energy) is responsible for water resources management.
 The Ministry of Urban Development Affairs is responsible for urban water supply.
 The Ministry of Rural Rehabilitation and Development is responsible for rural water supply.
 The Ministry of Finance is, together with the Ministry of Rural Rehabilitation and Development, responsible for the National Solidarity Fund, which is the major program for rural water supply in the country.
 The Ministry of Public Health undertakes programs to train women to educate the population about the importance of hygiene and clean water in preventing disease.

Service provision in urban areas 
The government has a policy of creating decentralized local public utilities run on the basis of commercial principles. Prior to 2007 there was a Central Authority for Water Supply and Sewerage (CAWSS) with provincial water departments in the 14 Afghan towns that had piped water supply systems. The entity did not perform well and was not run on the basis of private sector principles. As part of sector reforms the agency was dissolved and replaced by the Afghan Water Supply and Sewerage Corporation (AUWSSC), a holding company for local utilities called "Strategic Business Units" that are to be run based on commercial principles. As of 2010, the utility in Herat (see above) was probably the corporation's best-run strategic business unit in the country.

There are few qualified technical staff due to low salaries and poor working environments. Most of the staff working on projects are funded by donors and leave once a project ends. However, there are encouraging exceptions. For example, a brother-and-sister team in the city of Ghazni increased revenue collection from water tariffs by 75%, aided by the fact that meters located within premises can only be read by a woman if no man is in the house.

Service provision in rural areas

NGOs play a major role in providing water supply and sanitation in rural areas of Afghanistan. In 2003, through its Ministry of Rural Rehabilitation and Development (MRRD), the Government began to play a role in rural water supply. It developed a "Rural Water Supply and Sanitation Policy/Strategy" for Afghanistan. The strategy emphasizes the integration of health and hygiene education with water supply and sanitation and gives local communities a key role. They are supposed to decide about the type of infrastructure to be installed, finance part of its investment costs, and to operate and maintain it. This is to be done through democratically elected Community Development Councils (CDCs) that have been created throughout Afghanistan since 2003 as part of the National Solidarity Programme. The councils receive so-called block grants and are themselves in charge of choosing what to do with the block grants and selecting the companies that install the infrastructure. About 22,000 Councils have been created in all of Afghanistan's provinces as of 2010. About one quarter of the projects financed through the National Solidarity Programme are for water supply, sanitation and flood control, amounting to 11,700 projects with a value of US$157m financed between 2003 and 2010.

However, the Councils have limited to no technical skills in water engineering. Provincial Rural Rehabilitation and Development (PRRD) units provide technical assistance to the CDCs during the planning and construction phase, hiring social mobilizers to consult with communities and to appoint caretakers to ensure operation and maintenance. But the technical support to the Councils is often insufficient. According to a 2010 World Bank report, the quality of hand pumps installed is sometimes inferior, making them more prone to break down. The PRRDs have no mandate or means to support CDCs in case of major repairs or rehabilitation. “Capacity at the province or districts to support such maintenance or rehabilitation is almost nonexistent due to lack of tools, staff, and funding”, says a 2010 World Bank report.

External cooperation
The main external partners in the water sector are Germany, the United States and the World Bank.

Germany 
Germany provides financial cooperation through KfW development bank, as well as technical assistance through GIZ and the Federal Institute for Geosciences and Natural Resources, BGR. German cooperation in the water sector is focused on urban areas, in particular on Kabul and Herat, as well as Balkh, Kunduz, Takhar and Badakhshan provinces in Northern and Northeastern Afghanistan. BGR supported groundwater monitoring and modeling in the Kabul basin as well as training of local partners from 2003 to 2006.

United States 
Through USAID, the United States supports urban water supply through the Commercialization of Afghanistan Water and Sanitation Activity (CAWSA) project since 2008. USAID works mainly in the northern Afghan city of Mazar-e-Sharif, Gardez and Ghazni in the east as well as Jalalabad. From October 2009 until September 2012, USAID also funded the Afghan Sustainable Water Supply and Sanitation (SWSS) Project.

World Bank 
The main vehicle for World Bank support to water supply in Afghanistan is the National Solidarity Programme (see above under rural water supply), using funds from various countries channeled through the International Development Association or the Afghanistan Reconstruction Trust Fund. In addition, in 2006 the World Bank approved a US$40m grant to support an urban water supply project to improve water supply in Kabul. However, by 2010 almost no funds were disbursed and the infrastructure component of the project had been cancelled. It is now to be replaced by a pilot project to support small private operators, connecting 500 customers in one area of Kabul.

See also
List of dams and reservoirs in Afghanistan
List of rivers in Afghanistan
Drought in Afghanistan
Health in Afghanistan

References

External links
National Water Affairs Regulation Authority (NWARA)
Water shortages worsen in Afghanistan as drought persists (Al Jazeera, Dec. 28, 2018)
Legislation on Use of Water in Agriculture: Afghanistan (Library of Congress)
Afghanistan: Water management for peace (The Interpreter, Oct. 4, 2019)
Is Water Scarcity a Bigger Threat Than the Taliban in Afghanistan? (The Diplomat, Oct. 10, 2018)